The Lone Star League was the name of three American minor professional baseball leagues located in the state of Texas during the 20th century. The leagues operated from 1927–1929 (as a Class D circuit), 1947–1948 (Class C) and 1977 (Class A).

History

Each of the three leagues was the result of a reorganization of a previous circuit. The Lone Star League of the 1920s was created by merging two Class D loops, the East Texas League and the Texas Association; it disbanded on May 16, 1929. The eight-member postwar Lone Star circuit of 1947–1948 was formed from a foundation of four teams that had played in the Class C East Texas League of 1946. After the demise of the LSL, the East Texas League was revived for the 1949–1950 seasons.

Like the GSL, it was an official Class A minor league, not an "independent league," although its six teams were not affiliated with Major League Baseball farm systems. The 1977 Lone Star League played an 80-game regular season schedule from June 10 to the end of August. 

The defending Gulf States League champion Corpus Christi Seagulls, managed by future Major League pitching coach Leo Mazzone, dominated the Lone Star League, winning 53 of its 80 games and the South Division title. No championship playoff was held and the league folded after the 1977 campaign.

Member teams

Beeville, TX: Beeville Blazers 1977
Bryan, TX: Bryan Bombers 1947–1948
Corsicana, TX: Corsicana Oilers 1927–1928
Corpus Christi, TX: Corpus Christi Seagulls 1977
Gladewater, TX: Gladewater Bears 1948
Harlingen, TX: Harlingen Suns 1977
Henderson, TX: Henderson Oilers 1947–1948
Jacksonville, TX: Jacksonville Jax 1947
Kilgore, TX: Kilgore Drillers 1947–1948
Longview, TX: Longview Cannibals 1927; Longview Texans 1947–1948
Lufkin, TX: Lufkin Foresters 1947–1948

McAllen, TX: McAllen Dusters 1977
Marshall, TX: Marshall Indians 1927; Marshall Comets 1947; Marshall Tigers 1948 
Mexia, TX: Mexia Gushers 1927–1928
Palestine, TX: Palestine Pals 1927–1929
Paris, TX: Paris Snappers 1927; Paris Colts/Rustlers 1928 
Sherman, TX: Sherman Snappers 1929 
Texas City, TX: Texas City Stars 1977
Texarkana, TX: Texarkana Twins 1927–1929
Tyler, TX: Tyler Trojans 1927–1929, 1947–1948
Victoria, TX: Victoria Rosebuds 1977

Standings & statistics

1927 to 1929
1927 Lone Star League
schedule
 Longview withdrew May 21. Marshall folded to even the number of teams. Both teams were disbanded May 22.Finals: Tyler 4 games, Mexia 2.

1928 Lone Star League
schedule
Finals: Palestine 4 games, Texarkana 1.

 
1927 Lone Star League
schedule
Texarkana disbanded May 16. The league disbanded on the same date.

1947 to 1948, 1977
1947 Lone Star League
schedule
Playoffs: Kilgore 4 games, Tyler 0;Marshall 4 games, Longview 1.Finals: Kilgore 4 games, Marshall 2. 

 
1948 Lone Star League
schedule
Playoffs: Kilgore 4 games, Henderson 3; Longview 4 games, Tyler 3.Finals: Kilgore 4 games, Longview 0. 

 
1977 Lone Star League
 
Playoffs: None. Corpus Christi refused to play. Victoria and Texas City cancelled their series for a North Division championship.

References

External links
1927–1929 Lone Star League page at Baseball Reference
1947–1948 Lone Star League page at Baseball Reference
1977 Lone Star League page at Baseball Reference

Defunct minor baseball leagues in the United States
Baseball leagues in Texas
Sports leagues established in 1927
Sports leagues disestablished in 1977